Minjay Gewog (Dzongkha: སྨིན་རྒྱས་) is a gewog (village block) of Lhuntse District, Bhutan.

References

Gewogs of Bhutan
Lhuntse District